The California Seals are a collegiate summer baseball team that will play in the North Division of the Far West League.  They will begin play in 2011 in the new league at Evans Diamond Ballpark in Berkeley, California.  They are a former member of the West Coast Tri-State League, which merged with the Pacific West Baseball League to form the new FWL.

References

External links
 Far West League website

Amateur baseball teams in California
Sports in Berkeley, California
1956 establishments in California
Baseball teams established in 1956